Ronald Douglas Johnson served as the United States Ambassador to El Salvador from 2019 to 2021. He was appointed as ambassador by President Donald J. Trump on July 3, 2019. At the time of his appointment, he was serving as the Central Intelligence Agency’s Science and Technology Liaison to the U.S. Special Operations Command, based in Tampa, Florida.

Johnson has a Bachelor of Science from the State University of New York and a Master of Science from the National Intelligence University. From 1984 to 1998, Johnson served in the U.S. Army and retired as a colonel.

References

Year of birth missing (living people)
Living people
Alabama National Guard personnel
21st-century American diplomats
Ambassadors of the United States to El Salvador
People of the Central Intelligence Agency
National Intelligence University alumni
State University of New York alumni
United States Army colonels